Batrachoseps is a genus of lungless salamanders (plethodontids) often called slender salamanders. They can be distinguished from other lungless salamanders by the four toes they have on each foot.

Their genus name Batracho-seps means "frog-lizard", in reference to their projectile tongues.

Diet and physiology
The lungless salamanders, in addition to having no lungs, have long slender snake-shaped bodies with very small limbs that appear almost vestigial in several species. Their main diet consists of small insects, such as springtails, small bark beetles, crickets, young snails, mites, and spiders. Like all salamanders in this family, they have long frog-like projectile tongues which they use to grab their prey in a flash.

Unlike all other amphibians (and birds, and lizards, and nearly all fish) mature red blood cells in species in the genus Batrachoseps have no nucleus, which is a trait that is only known to occur in mammals and certain species of antarctic fish.

Distribution
Batrachoseps range from Oregon and California (USA) to northern Baja California (Mexico). Slender salamanders in California tolerate diverse variety of environments, as long as their basic needs are met.

Species
21 species are recognized in this genus, but their taxonomy is uncertain. Some species may in fact be subspecies of others, and some subspecies may be distinct species of their own. Genetic analysis is in process.

See also 

 Elizabeth Jockusch

References

External links

  Electronic Database accessible at http://research.amnh.org/herpetology/amphibia/index.php American Museum of Natural History. 
  AmphibiaWeb is available at http://amphibiaweb.org/. 
 
 

 
 
Amphibians of North America
Amphibians of the United States
Neogene amphibians of North America
Quaternary amphibians
Quaternary animals of North America
Taxa named by Charles Lucien Bonaparte